Ninetone Records is a Swedish record label, MCN, management and publisher based in Sundsvall, Sweden, with hits as their main focus. Ninetone Records has a substantial collection of platinum records and many top 10 hits on their CV's.

History
Ninetone Records was launched in 2006 by the producer Patrik Frisk, and immediately hit the charts in Sweden with their debut release Takida – "...Make You Breathe", after that Ninetone Records has hit the chart's multiple times and after broadening their repertoire they have entered the Swedish contest Melodifestivalen with multiple artists. Ninetone Records distribution is through Universal Music Group for Sweden and GoodToGo for the rest of the world.

Ninetone started their influencer network and MCN department in 2015, they work with some of the biggest influencers in Sweden today.

A small selection of signed bands and previous artists
 April Divine (2006)
 Itchy Daze (2008–present)
 Norma Bates (2008–present)
 Takida (2006–2008)
 Corroded (2008–present)
 Plan Three (2009–2014)
 Seremedy (2011–2013)
 YOHIO (2011–2015)
 Solitude (2012–present)
 Joakim Lundell (2017–present)
 Tommy Nilsson (2017–present)
 Roger Pontare (2017–present)
 Lisa Ajax (2020–present)

External links
 Ninetone Records official homepage

References

Swedish record labels
Swedish independent record labels